Edwin Welmont Melville (October 11, 1870 – April 22, 1942) was a Canadian politician. He served in the Legislative Assembly of New Brunswick as member of the Progressive Conservative party from 1925 to 1942.

References

1870 births
1942 deaths
20th-century Canadian politicians
Progressive Conservative Party of New Brunswick MLAs
People from Carleton County, New Brunswick